Brookfield Creek is a stream in the U.S. state of South Dakota.

Brookfield Creek took its name from an extinct town it flowed past which was also named Brookfield.

See also
List of rivers of South Dakota

References

Rivers of Moody County, South Dakota
Rivers of South Dakota